Devilian was a fantasy massively multiplayer online action role-playing video game (MMOARPG) developed by Bluehole Ginno Games and published by Trion Worlds.
In the game, the player assumes the role of a half-devil, known as a Devilian, which has two forms, a normal form and a devil form, which level up individually. The game was released on Steam on 10 December 2015. On January 19, 2018, it was announced that the game would be discontinued on March 5, 2018.

Reception 
On Metacritic, Devilian holds an aggregated score of 63/100, based on six critic reviews.

References 

2015 video games
Inactive massively multiplayer online games
Products and services discontinued in 2018
Massively multiplayer online role-playing games
Video games about demons
Video games developed in South Korea
Unreal Engine games
Windows games
Windows-only games
Action role-playing video games